Roadkill is a British four-part television thriller written and created by David Hare, and directed by Michael Keillor. It was first broadcast on BBC One on 18 October 2020. In the United States, it was broadcast as part of the Masterpiece anthology series on PBS starting 1 November 2020.

The series stars Hugh Laurie as the Justice Minister whose private life is under fire from his enemies. The series also features Helen McCrory in her final performance before her death in April 2021.

Cast 
 Hugh Laurie as Peter Laurence
 Helen McCrory as Dawn Ellison
 Pippa Bennett-Warner as Rochelle Madeley
 Millie Brady as Lily Laurence
 Ophelia Lovibond as Susan Laurence
 Shalom Brune-Franklin as Rose Dietl
 Iain De Caestecker as Duncan Knock
 Sarah Greene as Charmian Pepper
 Saskia Reeves as Helen Laurence
 Patricia Hodge as Lady Roche
 Olivia Vinall as Julia Blythe 
 Sidse Babett Knudsen as Madeleine Halle
 Danny Ashok as Luke Strand
 Gbemisola Ikumelo as Steff Frost
 Emma Cunniffe as Sydney
 Caroline Lee-Johnson as Bella Gayle
 Natalie Dew as Alisha Burman
 Anna Francolini as HJ Keane
 Vincenzo Nicoli as George
 Jennifer Hennessy as Bryony Beckett
 Yolanda Kettle as Joy Pelling
 Kate Lamb as Lindsay Storm
 Katie Leung as Margaret Moore
 Pip Torrens as Joe Lapidus
 Alice McMillan as Charlotte Hedge
 Tony Pitts as Mick 'the Mouth' Murray
 Nicholas Rowe as Adam De Banzie
 Sylvestra Le Touzel as Dame Vanessa Pollard

Episodes

Production
The series was filmed on location in London and Hastings.

Accolades

References

External links
 
 
 

2020 British television series debuts
2020 British television series endings
2020s British crime drama television series
2020s British television miniseries
British thriller television series
BBC television dramas
BBC television miniseries
English-language television shows
Television shows set in London